Steven Edward Simpson (August 30, 1948 – November 2, 1989) was an American professional baseball player whose career extended from 1970 through 1974.

In 11⅓ innings pitched, he allowed five earned runs, ten hits and eight bases on balls, with nine strikeouts. He dropped both of his big league decisions, on September 18, 1972, against the Los Angeles Dodgers and on September 29 against the Houston Astros.

Simpson died of a heart attack at age 41 in 1989 in Omaha, Nebraska.

External links
Baseball Reference

1948 births
1989 deaths
Alexandria Aces players
Baseball players from Missouri
Hawaii Islanders players
Lodi Padres players
Major League Baseball pitchers
Phoenix Giants players
San Diego Padres players
Tri-City Padres players
Victoria Toros players
Washburn Ichabods baseball players